"Talk to Me" is a song by Canadian rapper Tory Lanez and American rapper Rich the Kid. Mad Love Records and Interscope Records released it as the lead single from Lanez's third studio album, Love Me Now? (2018), on June 21, 2018.

Chart performance
"Talk to Me" debuted at number 76 on the US Billboard Hot 100 chart the week of November 10, 2018. On the week of January 12, 2019, the single reached its peak position at number 43 on the chart. The single spent a total of 16 weeks on the chart. On November 15, 2021, the single was certified double platinum by the Recording Industry Association of America (RIAA) for combined sales and streaming data of over two million units in the United States.

Remix 
Tory Lanez and Rich the Kid released a remix of the song featuring American rapper Lil Wayne.

Charts

Weekly charts

Year-end charts

Certifications

References

2018 singles
2018 songs
Rich the Kid songs
Tory Lanez songs
Songs written by Smash David
Songs written by Tory Lanez
Songs written by Rich the Kid